Allan Norman "Rusty" Markham (born 19 May 1960) is a Zimbabwean farmer and politician. He is currently a member of the National Assembly of Zimbabwe for Harare North since 2018. Previously, he served on the Harare City Council from 2013 to 2018. He is a member of the Movement for Democratic Change.

Early life and education 
Markham was born on 19 May 1960 in Choma, Northern Rhodesia (now Zambia). He is a third- or fourth-generation white Zimbabwean. His great-grandfather was an Anglican missionary to the country in the 1890s.

He attended John Cowie Primary School in Rusape, followed by Umtali Boys High School in Umtali (now Mutare) and Gwebi Agricultural College.

Career 
Markham works in agriculture and agronomy, and has been director of a company since 2004. He is a trustee of the Harare Wetlands Trust, the Stratford Road Community Trust, and the Hatcliffe Development Trust.

Markham joined the Movement for Democratic Change in 2000. From 2013 to 2018, he was a member of the Harare City Council representing Ward 18. He was elected to the National Assembly in the 2018 general election as the MDC Alliance candidate for the Harare North constituency, unseating the ZANU–PF incumbent, Tongesayi Mudambo. He was sworn in to Parliament on 5 September 2018.

Markham was arrested in January 2019 along with four other MDC parliamentarians. Later in 2019, he criticised the ruling government over what he claimed was corrupt interference with agriculture.

Personal life 
He is married and lives in the Borrowdale suburb of Harare.

References 

1960 births
Living people
21st-century Zimbabwean politicians
Members of the National Assembly of Zimbabwe
Movement for Democratic Change – Tsvangirai politicians
People from Choma District
People from Harare
People from Manicaland Province
White Rhodesian people
White Zimbabwean politicians
Zambian emigrants to Zimbabwe
Zimbabwean farmers
Zimbabwean people of British descent